Three ships of the French Navy have been named Courbet in honour of Amédée Courbet:
 
  (1882–1909), an ironclad battleship
  (1913–1944), lead dreadnought battleship of the 
 , in active service, a  multi-mission frigate

French Navy ship names